Madhura Swapanam is a 1977 Indian Malayalam-language film, directed by M. Krishnan Nair and produced by K. P. Kottarakkara. The film stars Kamal Haasan, Ravikumar, Jayaprabha, Unni Mary, Sukumari, Jose Prakash and Prema. The film has musical score by M. K. Arjunan. It was a remake of Telugu film Alludochadu. The LP record recognizes Kamal Haasan, Ravikumar, Jayaprabha and Unni Mary.

Cast 

Sukumari
Jose Prakash
Kamal Haasan
Prema
Sam
Sankaradi
Mancheri Chandran
Paul Vengola
Unni Mary
Jayaprabha
Mallika Sukumaran
Ravikumar

Soundtrack 
The music was composed by M. K. Arjunan and the lyrics were written by Sreekumaran Thampi.

References

External links 
 

1970s Malayalam-language films
1977 films
Films directed by M. Krishnan Nair